Larry Brown (born October 15, 1984) is a former American football defensive tackle. He began his career with the Oakland Raiders. He played collegiately for Oklahoma State Cowboys in the NCAA.

External links
Just Sports Stats

1984 births
Living people
Sportspeople from Spartanburg, South Carolina
American football defensive linemen
Oklahoma State Cowboys football players
Oakland Raiders players
Tulsa Talons players
Cleveland Gladiators players
Dallas Vigilantes players